Kosmos 501 ( meaning Cosmos 501), known before launch as DS-P1-Yu No.50, was a Soviet satellite which was launched in 1972 as part of the Dnepropetrovsk Sputnik programme. It was a  spacecraft, which was built by the Yuzhnoye Design Bureau, and was used as a radar calibration target for anti-ballistic missile tests.

Kosmos 501 was successfully launched into low Earth orbit at 05:59:57 UTC on 12 July 1972. The launch took place from Site 86/4 at Kapustin Yar, and used a Kosmos-2I 63SM carrier rocket. It was the last DS-P1-Yu satellite to be launched from Kapustin Yar. Upon reaching orbit, the satellite was assigned its Kosmos designation, and received the International Designator 1972-054A. The North American Aerospace Defense Command assigned it the catalogue number 06099.

Kosmos 501 was the fifty-sixth of seventy nine DS-P1-Yu satellites to be launched, and the fiftieth of seventy two to successfully reach orbit. It remained in orbit until it decayed and reentered the atmosphere on 9 May 1974.

See also

1972 in spaceflight

References

1972 in spaceflight
Kosmos satellites
Spacecraft launched in 1972
Dnepropetrovsk Sputnik program